Cornelis is a  Dutch form of the male given name Cornelius. Some common shortened versions of Cornelis in Dutch are Cees, Cor, Corné, Corneel, Crelis, Kees, Neel and Nelis.

Cornelis (Kees) and Johannes (Jan) used to be the most common given names in the Low Countries, and the origin of the term Yankees is commonly thought to derive from the term Jan-Kees for the Dutch settlers in New Netherland.

Among the notable persons named Cornelis are:
 Cornelis Engebrechtsz (c. 1462–1527), painter from Leiden
 Cornelis Massijs (c. 1508–1556), painter from Flanders, Belgium
 Cornelis Floris de Vriendt (1513/14-1575), architect and sculptor
 Cornelis Cort (c. 1533–1578), engraver and draughtsman
 Cornelis Corneliszoon (c. 1550–1607), inventor of the wind powered sawmill
 Cor Dillen (c. 1920–2009), director of Philips and their CEO in South America
 Cornelis van Haarlem (1562–1638), leading Northern Mannerist painter
 Cornelis de Houtman (1565–1599), explorer who started the Dutch spice trade
 Cornelis Drebbel (1572–1633), builder of the first navigable submarine
 Cornelis de Vos (1584–1651), Flemish Baroque painter
 Cornelis de Graeff (1599–1664), Golden Age politician
 Cornelis Evertsen (disambiguation) (1610–1666, 1628–1679, 1642–1706), three admirals in the Anglo-Dutch Wars
 Cornelis de Witt (1623–1672), politician of the Dutch Republic
 Cornelis Tromp (1629–1691), admiral in the Anglo-Dutch Wars and in the Scanian War
 Cornelis Pietersz Bega (1631/32-1664), painter and engraver
 Cornelis de Bruijn (1652–1726/27), artist and traveler
 Cornelis Cruys (1655–1727), first commander of the Russian Baltic Fleet
 Cornelis Dusart (1660–1704), genre painter, draftsman, and printmaker
 Cornelis (born 1953), former governor of West Kalimantan, Indonesia
 Cornelis de Pauw (1739–1849), philosopher, geographer and diplomat
 Cornelis Tiele (1830–1902), theologian and scholar
 Cornelis Lely (1854–1929), civil engineer and statesman
 Cornelis Jacobus Langenhoven (1873–1932), South African writer and poet
 Cornelis Bernardus van Niel (1897–1985), microbiologist
 Cornelis Berkhouwer (1919–1992), President of the European Parliament 1973–75
 Cornelis van Beverloo (1922–2010), artist better known under his pseudonym "Corneille"
 Cornelis Vreeswijk (1937–1987), Dutch-Swedish singer, poet and actor
 Cornelis Bodenstein (born 1992), South African-born cricketer
 Cornelis Schuuring (born 1942), Dutch racing cyclist

Surname 
Cornelis also is a patronymic surname, quite common in Flanders. People with this surname include:
 :nl:Evert Cornelis (1884–1931), Dutch conductor and organist
 Guy R. Cornelis (born 1946), Belgian microbiologist
 Hans Cornelis (born 1982), Belgian footballer
 Hendrik Cornelis (1910–1999), Belgian civil servant; last governor-general of Belgian Congo
 Jean Cornelis (born 1941), Belgian footballer
 Joseph Cornelis (born 1917), Belgian boxer

See also 
 
 
 Cees
 Cornelia (name), the feminine version of the name
 Cornelius (name)
 Kees (given name)

References 

Dutch masculine given names
Dutch-language surnames
Patronymic surnames